is a 1988 Japanese film directed by Yōichi Higashi.

Awards
10th Yokohama Film Festival
Won: Best Supporting Actress - Shūko Honami

References

1988 films
Films directed by Yōichi Higashi
1980s Japanese films